Consolación is a hamlet (pedanía) in the municipal term of Valdepeñas. It is located 11 km north of the town, at the intersection between Autovía A-4 (Autovia del Sur) and road CR-5214.
The village was built by the Instituto Nacional de Colonización in 1949 and its streets are arranged in a geometrical pattern characteristic of those settlements. Its former name was Villanueva de Franco, after General Franco. According to the 2006 census of the INE, the village has a population of 223 inhabitants.

References

External links
Valdepeñas (Ciudad Real)
Consolación, el pueblo que nació de un comentario, cumple 60 años

Populated places in the Province of Ciudad Real